The 2007 Mnet KM Music Festival (MKMF) was the ninth of the annual music awards in Seoul, South Korea that took place on November 17, 2007, at the Seoul Sports Complex.

Boy band Big Bang, trio SG Wannabe, and solo artist Yangpa lead the nominees with five nominations each. By the end of the ceremony, Big Bang received two awards including Song of the Year daesang award. In addition, Epik High and Clazziquai both received 2 wins as well with the former receiving the Album of the Year daesang award and the latter winning both of their nominations.

Background
The award ceremony was held for the ninth consecutive time. The event took place at the Seoul Olympic Stadium for the first time with Shin Dong-yup as a returning host for the fifth time and Lee Da-hae as his co-host.

Japanese artist Gackt performed on the stage for the second time since the sixth ceremony, while co-host Lee Da-hae performed "I Love Rock 'n' Roll" kor. version during the middle of the show.

Controversy
Lee Min Woo (M) and Shin Hye Sung, both members of Shinhwa left the event right before broadcasting.

Criteria

The following criteria for winners include:

Winners and nominees
Winners are listed first and highlighted in boldface.

Special awards
 Auction Netizen Popularity Award: Super Junior – "Don't Don"
 Foreign Viewers' Choice Award: Shinhwa – "Once In A Lifetime"
 Mnet.com Award: F.T. Island
 Mobile Popularity Award: Super Junior – "Don't Don"
 MKMF Tribute Award: Insooni

Multiple awards

Artist(s) with multiple wins
The following artist(s) received two or more wins (excluding the special awards):

Artist(s) with multiple nominations
The following artist(s) received two or more nominations:

Performers and presenters
The following individuals and groups, listed in order of appearance, presented awards or performed musical numbers.

Performers

Presenters

References

External links
 Mnet Asian Music Awards  official website

MAMA Awards ceremonies
Mnet Km Music Festival
Mnet Km Music Festival
Mnet Km Music Festival
Mnet Music Video Festival, 2007